Duophonic is the debut album by American vocal duo Charles & Eddie, released in 1992. The album has influences of "classic Northern soul of the '60s and '70s", and includes the worldwide smash hit "Would I Lie to You?" along with two further singles: "NYC (Can You Believe This City?)" and "House Is Not a Home".

Critical reception
Amy Linden from Entertainment Weekly gave the album an A, writing, "By laying silky harmonies on top of gritty hip-hop beats, gospel organ fills, and languid guitars, Charles & Eddie’s Duophonic creates an R&B paradise."

Track listing

Personnel 

 Charles Pettigrew – lead vocals (1-4, 6, 7, 8, 10-13), backing vocals (2, 3, 4, 6, 7, 8, 10-13), all vocals (5)
 Eddie Chacon – lead vocals (1-4, 6, 7, 8, 10-13), backing vocals (2, 3, 4, 7, 10-13), all vocals (9), percussion (13) 
 Amp Fiddler – organ (1-4, 8, 12), acoustic piano (1, 3), Wurlitzer electric piano (1, 8), clavinet (2, 4, 12), Rhodes (2, 3, 5, 6)
 Garry Hughes – strings (1, 3, 7, 8, 12), loops (2), programming (2, 3, 8, 11), sampling (5), keyboard programming (5), percussion (7), clavinet (8), Rhodes (8, 11), keyboards (11)
 Josh Deutsch – loops (2), programming (2), guitars (12)
 Ed Tuton – loops (2), programming (2)
 Greg Smith – additional programming (3)
 Paul Gordon – keyboards (10), organ (10) 
 Paul Griffin – organ (10, 13)
 Chris Bruce – guitars (1, 2, 10)
 Jean-Paul Bourelly – guitars (2, 9)
 David Fiuczynski – guitars (3, 4, 6, 7, 8, 11, 12)
 Jeff Anderson – bass (1-4, 6, 7, 8, 10, 12)
 Lonnie Hillyer – wah bass (4), guitars (13), bass (13)
 Yossi Fine – bass (11)
 Gene Lake – drums (1-4, 6, 7, 8, 11, 12)
 Carla Azar – drums (10)
 Daniel Sadownick – percussion (1-4, 6, 8, 10, 11, 12)
 Andy Snitzer – saxophone (5, 12)
 Michael Davis – trombone (5, 12)
 Kent Smith – trumpet (5, 12)
 Lani Groves – backing vocals (2, 11)
 Vaneese Thomas – backing vocals (2, 3, 11)
 Andrew Wyatt – backing vocals (2, 3, 11)
 Barry Carl – backing vocals (3)

Production 
 Producer – Josh Deutsch
 Additional Track Production on Tracks 6, 8 & 11 – Andy Dean and Ben Wolff
 Production Assistance and Technician – Artie Smith
 Engineers – Michael Christopher and Ed Tuton
 Additional Engineer – Bradshaw Leigh
 Assistant Engineers – Shannon Carr, Suzanne Dyer, Phil Klum and Joe Warda.
 Mixing – Femi Jiya and Ed Tuton
 Mixed at The Hit Factory, Electric Lady Studios and Sound On Sound Recording Studio (New York, NY).
 Mastered by Howie Weinberg at Masterdisk (New York, NY).
 Project Coordination – Janice Prendergast
 Art Direction and Design – Icon (21)
 Photography – Richard Lohr
 Styling – Cathy Casterine
 Management – Tony Smith and Patty Spinks at Hit & Run America.

Samples
 "NYC (Can You Believe This City?)" samples "For What It's Worth" by Buffalo Springfield

Charts

Weekly charts

Year-end charts

References 

1992 debut albums
Capitol Records albums
Charles & Eddie albums